The Tjial were an indigenous Australian people of the Northern Territory who are now extinct.

Country
They were wedged between the lower Victoria River and the upper West Baines River.

Social organization
R. H. Mathews argued that the Tjial, together with two other tribes of the Victoria River Valley, namely the Bilingara and Kwarandji, shared an identical classificatory pattern for intermarriage. Mathews argued that the system, classifying women into two cycles, each having "perpetual succession within itself," was one characterized by matrilineal descent. His schema, he claimed, was quickly adopted by Francis Gillen and Baldwin Spencer in their analysis of the class system of the Bingongina, which however redeployed the pattern to argue that the latter had but two moieties exhibiting patrilineal descent. A controversy over the interpretation of these data sets arose, with A. R. Radcliffe-Brown effectively winning the day by arguing that the quarrel over matrilineal/patrilineal descent was confused by a failure to appreciate that "descent" in the abstract is meaningless, unless one takes into account the intricacies of class, phratry and totem relations, and irregularities in the overall system.

History of contact
Writing in 1901, R. H. Mathews classified the Tjial as an "important tribe", but by the time of Norman Tindale's writing, in 1978 they had become extinct. With their disappearance, their lands were taken over by the Ngaliwurru to their north.

Alternative names
 Cheeal, Chee'al
 Geelowng
 Jael
 Jeelowng

Notes

Citations

Sources

Aboriginal peoples of the Northern Territory